Tourneur is a French surname, literally meaning "lathe operator". Notable people with the surname include:

 Cyril Tourneur (1575-1626), English dramatist
 Jacques Tourneur (1904-1977), French film director
 Maurice Tourneur (1873-1961), French film director and screenwriter

See also
 Le Tourneur, in France
 Turner (surname)
 Drechsler
 Drexler

French-language surnames
Occupational surnames